Champa Chakma (born 1 January 1992) is a Bangladeshi former cricketer who played as a slow left-arm orthodox bowler. She played for Bangladesh between 2007 and 2011, before the side was granted full international status. She played domestic cricket for Chittagong Division.

Career

Asian Games
Champa was a member of the squad that won a silver medal in cricket against the China national women's cricket team at the 2010 Asian Games in Guangzhou, China, although she did not play a match.

Chakma is one of the subjects of the 2008 documentary Stories of Change, which shows the struggles of five successful Bangladeshi women.

References

External links
 
 

1992 births
Living people
Chakma people
Bangladeshi Buddhists
Bangladeshi women cricketers
Chittagong Division women cricketers
Cricketers at the 2010 Asian Games
Asian Games medalists in cricket
Asian Games silver medalists for Bangladesh
Medalists at the 2010 Asian Games